Farnon may refer to:

 Charmian Anne Farnon (1942–2016), American actress better known as Charmian Carr
 Darlene Farnon (born 1950), American actress better known as Darleen Carr
 Dennis Farnon (born 1923), Canadian composer and arranger
 Robert Farnon (1917–2005), Canadian composer, conductor, musical arranger and trumpet player
 Tristan A. Farnon (born 1970), American web comic author
 Siegfried Farnon and Tristan Farnon, characters in the books of James Herriot, based on the real-life brothers Donald and Brian Sinclair